The Church of Our Lady of Remedy is a Roman Catholic church  located in Kotor, Montenegro, belonging to the Roman Catholic Diocese of Kotor. The church is perched on the slope of St. John Mountain. It was completed in 1518.

Visitors can only reach the church on foot by climbing up stairs with over 650 steps.

The oldest known building in Montenegro, dating back to the 6th century, has been found under the Church of Our Lady of Remedy. That building was an early Christian basilica, located close to the main city gate in the Old Town of Kotor.

References

External links 
 Church of Our Lady of Remedy at Go Eastern Europe
  http://www.kotorskabiskupija.net/index.php?option=com_content&task=view&id=40&Itemid=57

Roman Catholic churches in Montenegro
Tourist attractions in Kotor
16th-century Roman Catholic church buildings
Roman Catholic churches completed in 1518